HMS H24 was a British H-class submarine built by Vickers Limited, Barrow-in-Furness, as part of the Batch 3 H-class submarines. She was launched on 14 November 1917 and was commissioned on 30 April 1918.

HMS H24 was sold on 4 May 1934 in Sunderland.

Design

H24 was fitted with an anti-aircraft gun and four  torpedo tubes. Its torpedo tubes were fitted to the bows and the submarine was loaded with eight 21-inch torpedoes. It is a Holland 602 type submarine but was designed to meet Royal Navy specifications. Its complement was twenty-two crew members.

References

Bibliography
 

 

British H-class submarines
Ships built in Barrow-in-Furness
1917 ships
World War I submarines of the United Kingdom
Royal Navy ship names